Zemborzyce may refer to the following places in Poland:

Zemborzyce Dolne
Zemborzyce Podleśne
Zemborzyce Tereszyńskie
Zemborzyce Wojciechowskie